MFC 22: Payoff was a mixed martial arts event held by the Maximum Fighting Championship (MFC), it was held on October 2, 2009 at the River Cree Resort and Casino in Enoch, Alberta. It featured the return of Jason MacDonald, who was competing in his first fight since being released by the UFC, against Travis Lutter, also competing in his first fight since being released by the UFC. The co-main event featured Antonio McKee defending the MFC lightweight title against Brazilian Carlo Prater. The event also featured UFC veterans Luigi Fioravanti, John Alessio, Pete Spratt, David Heath, Mike Nickels and Marvin Eastman. This event was broadcast on HDNet.

Fight Card

See also
 Maximum Fighting Championship
 List of Maximum Fighting Championship events
 2009 in Maximum Fighting Championship

References

22
2009 in mixed martial arts
Mixed martial arts in Canada
Sport in Alberta
2009 in Canadian sports